There are two wars that are named Schleswig War:

the First Schleswig War
and the Second Schleswig War